Vadim Aleksandrovich Chyorny (born 21 June 1997) is a Russian football player.

Club career
He made his debut in the Russian Professional Football League for FC Volga Ulyanovsk on 18 April 2017 in a game against FC Syzran-2003.

He made his Russian Football National League debut for FC Fakel Voronezh on 13 April 2019 in a game against FC Krasnodar-2.

References

External links
 
 

1997 births
Footballers from Moscow
Living people
Russian footballers
Association football midfielders
FC Fakel Voronezh players
FC KAMAZ Naberezhnye Chelny players
FC Metallurg Lipetsk players
FC Volga Ulyanovsk players
Russian First League players
Russian Second League players